Karenjy is an automobile manufacturer based in Fianarantsoa, Madagascar. It produced vehicles from 1985 to 1995 when the company was dissolved. In January 2009, the company was re-established and production of the Karenjy Tily, which is based on the Renault 18 and Renault Express, commenced the same year.

In 2019, the factory produced a popemobile for the arrival of Pope Francis in Fianarantso.

Models 
Two models were available in his productive life:
 MAZANA 4x4, diesel engine powered, available in sedan and convertible
 FOAKA 2x4 pickup, petrol engine. The chassis is welded, fitted with Renault mechanical parts and a locally produced fiberglass/composite body.

References

External links
Le Relais Madagascar SARL
Historia Karenjy
team-bhp.com

Car manufacturers of Madagascar
Fianarantsoa